Novy Kuyuk (Yañı Köyök) is a rural locality (a village) in Istyaksky Selsoviet, Yanaulsky District, Bashkortostan, Russia. The population was 2 as of 2010. There is 1 street.

Geography 
Novy Kuyuk is located 43 km northeast of Yanaul (the district's administrative centre) by road. Kirga is the nearest rural locality.

References 

Rural localities in Yanaulsky District